The Miss Minnesota's Outstanding Teen competition is the pageant that selects the representative for the U.S. state of Minnesota in the Miss America's Outstanding Teen pageant.

Julia Schumacher of Mankato was crowned Miss Minnesota's Outstanding Teen on March 26, 2022 at Southwest Christian High School in Chaska, Minnesota. She competed for the title of Miss America's Outstanding Teen 2023 at the Hyatt Regency Dallas in Dallas, Texas on August 12, 2022 where she placed 3rd runner-up and was 4th runner-up for National Fundraising.

Results summary 
The results of Miss Minnesota's Outstanding Teen as they participated in the national Miss America's Outstanding Teen competition. The year in parentheses indicates the year of the Miss America's Outstanding Teen competition the award/placement was garnered.

Placements 
 3rd runners-up: Julia Schumacher (2023)
 4th runners-up: Alexis Houle (2012)
 Top 12: Emily Schumacher (2018)

Awards

Preliminary awards 
 Preliminary Evening Wear/On-Stage Question: Alexis Houle (2012), Julia Schumacher (2023)

Other awards 
 Academic Achievement Award: Natalie Davis (2007), Chantal Wilson (2008)
 America's Choice: Emily Schumacher (2018)
 National Fundraiser Award 4th Runner-up: Julia Schumacher (2023)
 Teens in Action Award Finalists: Corrina Swiggum (2014), Rachel Weyandt (2016)

Winners

Notes

References

Minnesota
Women in Minnesota
Minnesota culture
Annual events in Minnesota